The Staffordshire Senior Cup is an annual rugby union knock-out club competition organised by the Staffordshire Rugby Union.  It was first introduced during the 1976–77 season, with the inaugural winners being Walsall. It is the most important rugby union cup competition in Staffordshire, ahead of the Staffordshire Intermediate Cup and Staffordshire Owen Cup.

The Senior Cup is open to club sides based in Staffordshire and parts of the West Midlands playing in tier 5 (Midlands Premier), tier 6 (Midlands 1 West) and tier 7 (Midlands 2 West (North)) of the English rugby union system.  The current format is a knock-out competition with a first round, semi-finals and a final played at a neutral ground in April–May.

Staffordshire Senior Cup winners

Number of wins
 Lichfield (13)
 Walsall (11)
 Burton (8)
 Longton (7)
 Stoke-on-Trent (2)
 Wolverhampton (1)

Notes

See also
 Staffordshire RU
 Staffordshire Intermediate Cup
 Staffordshire Owen Cup
 English rugby union system
 Rugby union in England

References

External links
 Staffordshire RU

Recurring sporting events established in 1976
1976 establishments in England
Rugby union cup competitions in England
Rugby union in Staffordshire
Sport in Staffordshire